Mercês is a former parish (freguesia) in the municipality of Lisbon, Portugal. At the administrative reorganization of Lisbon on 8 December 2012 it became part of the parish Misericórdia. It has a total area of 0.30 km2 and total population of 5,093 inhabitants (2001); density: 16,808.6 inhabitants/km2.

Main sites
The Guardian

External links
Mercês' parish website

References 

Former parishes of Lisbon